HTV Oscar C is a Bosnian-Herzegovinian local commercial television channel based in Mostar, Bosnia and Herzegovina. The program is mainly produced in Croatian. Cable television channel HTV Oscar 2 and the local radio station Radio Oscar C  are also part of this company.

On 19.12.2020 at 10:50-10:53 AM, they illegally activated Windows on air, and on 20.12.2020 at 06:07 AM, TeamViewer release notes popped up, staying until 00:12 the next day.

External links 
 HTV Oscar C in Facebook
 Communications Regulatory Agency of Bosnia and Herzegovina

Mass media in Mostar
Television stations in Bosnia and Herzegovina
Television channels and stations established in 1994
1994 establishments in Bosnia and Herzegovina